The Mexican state of Durango held an election on Sunday, July 4, 2004.
At stake was the office of the Durango State Governor, all 25 members of the unicameral Durango State Congress, and 39 mayors and municipal councils.

Turnout was 49.7% of the 977,699 duranguenses eligible to vote.

Governor
At the time of the election, the sitting governor was Ángel Sergio Guerrero Mier of the Institutional Revolutionary Party (PRI).  No party other than the PRI has ever governed Durango. 

With 90% of the results counted, Ismael Hernández of the PRI was set for victory with around 52% of the votes cast. Andrés Galván of the PAN was in second place with about 30%.

The new governor of Durango was  sworn in on 15 September 2004.

On the same day
2004 Chihuahua state election
2004 Zacatecas state election

See also
Politics of Mexico
List of political parties in Mexico

External links
Durango State Electoral Institute

2004 elections in Mexico
Durango elections
July 2004 events in Mexico